Twyford is a village and civil parish in the Aylesbury Vale district of Buckinghamshire, England.

Twyford's toponym is derived from the Old English for "double ford". It is a common name in England.

The village has a Church of England parish church, a URC chapel and a Church of England primary school. There is one public house, one general store which is community owned and run by volunteers.

Parish church
The Church of England parish church of the Assumption of the Blesséd Virgin Mary is 12th-century, with four-bay 13th-century nave arcades and a 14th-century west tower. Monuments in the church include a large baroque one in the south aisle commemorating Richard Wenman, 1st Viscount Wenman, and a smaller one to his father Thomas Wenman.

The tower has a ring of six bells. The fifth bell was cast by an unidentified bellfounder in about 1599. W&J Taylor cast the treble bell in 1828 at their then foundry in Oxford. William Blew and Sons of Birmingham cast the fourth bell in 1869. Gillett & Johnston of Croydon cast the treble, second and third bells in 1907. There is also a Sanctus bell that was cast in about 1699.

The church is a Grade I listed building.

Amenities

Twyford's one public house is The Crown Inn. There used to be three, but both The Red Lion and The Seven Stars were closed and converted in the past 15 years.

Twyford Church of England School is a mixed, voluntary controlled infants' school for the 4–11 age range. The school once taught as few as 25 pupils, but has since recovered to its highest class numbers ever, at just over 100.

Notable residents
Two brothers who achieved high episcopal office, Euseby Cleaver  (1746-1819),   Archbishop of Dublin,  and William Cleaver (1742-1815),  Bishop of Bangor,  were born in Twyford, where their father was headmaster of the local boys school.

References

Further reading

 

Villages in Buckinghamshire
Civil parishes in Buckinghamshire